"Big" is a song by English singer Rita Ora, French disc jockey David Guetta, and Kazakh disc jockey Imanbek featuring American rapper Gunna from Ora and Imanbek's collaborative extended play Bang (2021). The song was penned by the artists, Eskeerdo, Ed Sheeran, Marcus Lomax, Mike Hawkins, Sam Martin, Toby Green, and William Spencer Bastian, the latter four producing it alongside the DJs. It was released as the lead single from the EP for digital download and streaming in various countries by Atlantic and Warner on 12 February 2021. Featuring dance, EDM, electro-pop, hip hop, and house music, the song's lyrics celebrate the moment of having a good time and the memories of crazy nights.

Following its release, "Big" garnered critical acclaim from music critics for the collaboration between the artists, the music and sound as well as the vocal delivery of Ora and Gunna. The song peaked at number seven in Bulgaria and charted in Germany, Hungary, Ireland, Lithuania, Switzerland and the United Kingdom. It also achieved number 11 on the US Billboard Dance/Electronic Songs ranking. Filmed in Bulgaria, the music video for the song premiered to YouTube . It serves as a tribute to Ora's Albanian and Imanbek's Kazakh heritages, with Ora's performance featuring her in traditional Albanian attire.

Background and composition 

"Big" was penned by Ora, Guetta, Imanbek, Gunna (Sergio Kitchens), Alexander Eskeerdo Izquierdo, Ed Sheeran, Marcus Lomax, Mike Hawkins, Sam Martin, Toby Green and William Spencer Bastian, with the production completed by Guetta, Imanbek, Bastian, Green, Hawkins and Martin. Talking about the creation, Ora stated that "When we received David Guetta's proposal, we loved it. The chorus was different, we felt we had to add something more to it. I called my friend Ed Sheeran for help [...] and then he wrote a new hook in less than 15 minutes". Atlantic and Warner released the song for digital download and streaming in various countries on 12 February 2021 as the lead single from Ora and Imanbek's collaborative extended play Bang (2021). It blends elements of dance, EDM, electro-pop, hip hop and house music, with its lyrics cheering the moment of having a good time and the memories of crazy nights. She highlights her excitement for a good time, singing lines such as, "You gon' know about it when we come through/ Bad bitches coming in twos/ Ain't nobody tellin' what we gon' do/ The way we run through, yeah, yeah". Accompanied by ad-libs from Gunna, Ora opens the first verse over a dark and thumping instrumental by Guetta and Imanbek. Following the chorus, Gunna can be heard in the background, while Ora leads the second verse that follows. Gunna then delivers a rap performance with his mumble-rap signature in the third verse.

Reception 

Following its release, "Big" garnered critical acclaim from music critics. Katie Bain from Billboard characterised the song as a "dancefloor of our minds" and highlighted the collaborative effort between the artists, commenting that "we kinda wish it were longer that two minutes and 37 seconds". Jack White for Official Charts Company labeled it a "lavish party anthem and a sure-fire floorfiller" and complimented the collaboration as well as the vocal performances of Ora and Gunna. Jannik Pesenacker of Dance-Charts correspondingly praised the collaboration for delivering a "strong radio song", with particular commendation for the harmony between the instrumental and vocals of Ora and Gunna. While Sonia from NRJ noted it as a "well-paced [...] hit", the staff of Kiss FM viewed the song as a "musical statement [...] that certainly deserves its name". Nassim Aziki for Fun Radio named it a "good vintage" and responded that "the pop side of [Ora] combined with the electro of [Guetta] works perfectly well". In a mixed review, Sara Elisabeth Nedergaard from Gaffa opined that the song "is not bad" but pointed out that Guetta's signature sound "never changes" and "may become a little tired". While reviewing Bang, Farrell Sweeney from Dancing Astronaut hailed the song for boasting a "heavy-hitting lineup" and regarded it as the "contender for project's radio favorite". Cameron Sunkel for EDM.com asserted that the collection does not disappoint, adding that "the [song] seeks to make a decisive statement with flashy lyrics and an even sleeker club bassline".

Peaking at number seven in Bulgaria, "Big" reached number 15 in Hungary, number 53 in both Ireland and the United Kingdom, number 68 in Switzerland, number 82 in Lithuania and number 95 in Germany. The song also peaked at number 11 on the US Billboard Dance/Electronic Songs ranking and number 154 on the Global Excl. US chart. It further garnered airplay in the Commonwealth of Independent States (CIS) and Russia, also entering the top 50 in the airplay rankings of Finland and Mexico.

Music video 

To accompany the release, a music video for "Big" premiered to Guetta's official YouTube channel on 12 February 2021, which is a tribute to Ora's Albanian and Imanbek's Kazakh heritages. The video was filmed at the mount of Buzludzha and the cities of Pernik and Sofia in Bulgaria. Part of the production team included Alexandra Dragova, Becky Hicks, Evelyn Malezanova and Kosta Karakashyan. The traditional Albanian attire donned by her was created by Kosovo-Albanian designer Valdrin Sahiti, which was aimed to display the Albanian ethnographic style, as intended by Ora. Intended to create a visually distinctive "fantasy wonderland movie", the singer described the video as the most challenging and thrilling of her career. She stated that "It was so amazing to be able to mix all these cultures together and come up with a body of work that’s a world of its own".

The music video begins with an aerial shot capturing a vehicle transporting a group of individuals, leading to a solo performance by Ora on a pipeline located within a block of residential buildings. Next, it shifts on Ora inside the vehicle, with the camera focusing to her red boots adorned with the Albanian flag. A sequence of individuals dressed in white attire riding black horses through a misty field follows. Then, Ora is depicted while dancing in front of a mirror amidst a colorful pink and purple setting. Gunna makes his appearance performing from the back seat of a smoky grey car. Further interspersed shots portay Ora accompanied by a troupe of dancers performing to the song on the pipeline. The two-minute and 55 second long video ends with her fleeing on horseback to reach a frozen fortress.

Selene Morale from Los 40 highlighted the colorful and voluminous costumes in the video, which according to her create a contrast against the backdrop of a gray and industrial setting. She further explained that "it is undoubtedly an analogy of what Ora's family must have experienced when they moved to England: the nature of your place of origin, in contrast to a world of cement, after arriving in the suburbs of a big city". Sonia of NRJ commented that the video "perfectly matches the climate of the moment". The staff of Kiss FM opined that it represents the collision of "fantasy and reality".

Charts

Weekly charts

Year-end charts

Release history

References 

2021 singles
2021 songs
Rita Ora songs
David Guetta songs
Imanbek songs
Gunna (rapper) songs
Songs written by Rita Ora
Songs written by Eskeerdo
Songs written by David Guetta
Songs written by Ed Sheeran
Songs written by Sam Martin (singer)
Songs written by Gunna (rapper)
Atlantic Records singles
Warner Records singles
Music videos shot in Bulgaria
Electropop songs
Song recordings produced by David Guetta